This is a list of international presidential trips made by Barack Obama, the 44th president of the United States. Barack Obama made 52 international trips to 58 countries (in addition to visiting the West Bank) during his presidency, which began on January 20, 2009 and ended on January 20, 2017. 

Obama set the record as the most-traveled president for any first year in office; Obama made ten trips to 21 countries (four countries were visited twice) and was out of the U.S. a total of 40 days.

Summary
The number of visits per country where President Obama traveled are:
 One visit to Argentina, Brazil, Cambodia, Chile, Colombia, Costa Rica, Cuba, Egypt, El Salvador, Estonia, Ethiopia, Ghana, Greece, Iraq, Ireland, Jamaica, Jordan, Kenya, Laos, Netherlands, Norway, Panama, Peru, Portugal, Senegal, Singapore, Spain, Sweden, Tanzania, Thailand, Trinidad and Tobago, Vietnam and the West Bank
 Two visits to Australia, Belgium, Czech Republic, Denmark, India, Indonesia, Israel, Italy, Malaysia, Myanmar, Philippines, Russia, South Africa, Turkey and Vatican City
 Three visits to Canada, China and Poland
 Four visits to Afghanistan, Japan,  and South Korea
 Five visits to Mexico, Saudi Arabia, and the United Kingdom
 Six visits to France and Germany

2009

2010

2011

2012

2013

2014

2015

2016

Multilateral meetings
Multilateral meetings of the following intergovernmental organizations took place during President Obama's term in office (2009–2017).

See also
 Foreign policy of the Barack Obama administration
 Foreign policy of the United States
 List of international trips made by Hillary Clinton as United States Secretary of State
 List of international trips made by John Kerry as United States Secretary of State

References

External links
 Travels of President Barack Obama. U.S. Department of State Office of the Historian.
 Travels of the Obama Presidency. (archived) – slideshow by ABC News.

Presidential travels of Barack Obama
Lists of 21st-century trips
2000s politics-related lists
21st century in international relations
Obama, Barack, international
Barack Obama-related lists